St. Simons Island Airport at McKinnon Field (formerly Malcolm McKinnon Airport)  is six miles east of Brunswick, in Glynn County, Georgia.

Located on St. Simons Island, it is also known St. Simons Island Airport at McKinnon field. The airfield was named after Malcom B. McKinnon, chairman of the County Commission when construction started in 1935. The airport opened on May 28, 1938, seven months after his death.  During World War II, it operated as Naval Air Station St. Simons Island and was eventually home to the Navy Radar Training School. Although NAS St. Simons Island remained an active air station following the war, its activities were eventually merged into nearby NAS Glynco and by 1947 it was finally closed as a naval air station and became a civil airport.

The airport is on the site of Mulberry Grove Plantation, which was owned by the Demeré family from the 1750s until the Civil War.

Previous airline service 

Delta Air Lines served Brunswick, Georgia (which it listed as Sea Island in its timetables) from 1945 through the 1960s. In 1946 a Delta Douglas DC-3 was scheduled Chicago - Cincinnati - Knoxville - Asheville - Greenville, SC - Spartanburg, SC - Augusta - Savannah - Brunswick - Jacksonville - Miami. In 1969 Delta Convair 440s flew nonstop to Atlanta and Jacksonville.  Delta moved its Brunswick flights to Naval Air Station Glynco (now the Brunswick Golden Isles Airport) where it flew McDonnell Douglas DC-9-30s in the early 1970s.

Eastern Airlines served Brunswick from 1945 until 1964.

Facilities

In the year ending August 7, 2007 the airport had 47,750 aircraft operations, average 130 per day: 98% general aviation and 2% military.

References

External links 

Glynn County Airport Commission

Airports in Georgia (U.S. state)
Buildings and structures in Glynn County, Georgia
Transportation in Glynn County, Georgia
St. Simons, Georgia